The Back Page is a 1931 American pre-Code comedy film directed by and starring Fatty Arbuckle. The title satirizes the famous play and 1931 film The Front Page.

Plot
A young woman seeking a job as a newspaper editor comes to a small newspaper run by an old man.

Cast
 Virginia Brooks
 Wheeler Oakman
 George MacFarlane
 Roscoe 'Fatty' Arbuckle

See also
 Fatty Arbuckle filmography

References

External links

1931 films
1931 comedy films
1931 short films
American black-and-white films
Educational Pictures short films
Films directed by Roscoe Arbuckle
Films about journalists
American comedy short films
1930s American films